NESB may refer to:
 National European Social Movement (Nationaal Europese Sociale Beweging), a Dutch neo-Nazi party, 1953–1955
 New England School of Broadcasting, original name of New England School of Communications
 Non-English speaking background, superseded term used in social discourse relating to multiculturalism in Australia